Tariki is a small farming community immediately to the east of Mount Taranaki in the west of New Zealand's North Island. It lies on SH 3 halfway between the towns of Inglewood and Stratford. Several small streams, all tributaries of the Manganui River, pass close to Tariki.

The origin of the settlement's name is unknown – it may be named for a person, or be a corruption of the Māori term tarika, meaning to toss and turn.

References

Populated places in Taranaki
New Plymouth District